Bafran (also Romanized as Bāfrān and Bāfarān; also known as Bāfrān Minar) is a city in the Central District of Nain County, Isfahan Province, Iran. At the 2006 census, its population was 2,138, in 590 families.

References 

Populated places in Nain County
Cities in Isfahan Province